2023 in the Philippines details notable events that have occurred, or are scheduled to take place, in the Philippines in 2023. The COVID-19 pandemic, which largely defined the preceding three years (2020, 2021, and 2022), continued into 2023.

Incumbents 
 President: Bongbong Marcos (PFP)
 Vice President: Sara Duterte (Lakas–CMD)
 Congress (19th):
 Senate President: Migz Zubiri (Independent)
 House Speaker: Martin Romualdez (Lakas-CMD)
 Chief Justice: Alexander Gesmundo

Ongoing events
 COVID-19 pandemic
 Philippine sugar crisis

Events

January 
 January 1 – 2023 Philippine airspace closure: The Civil Aviation Authority of the Philippines closes the country's airspace for nearly six hours due to a power outage in its air traffic management center that affected its communication systems, disrupting more than 280 commercial flights and more than 56,000 passengers.
 January 4 – The Ateneo de Manila University debate team wins the 2023 World Universities Debating Championship, the world's largest international debating tournament, held at the King Juan Carlos University in Madrid, Spain. It is the first time that a Philippine university has won the title.
 January 6 – Juanito Remulla III, son of Justice Secretary Jesus Crispin Remulla, is freed from detention after being acquitted by the Las Piñas Regional Trial Court of illegal drug possession, citing failure to provide further evidence and lapses committed by anti-drug agents.
 January 10 – Territorial disputes in the South China Sea: The Supreme Court nullifies the Joint Marine Seismic Undertaking agreement between the Philippine National Oil Company, the China National Offshore Oil Corporation, and Petrovietnam to conduct joint oil and gas exploration activities within the Philippine exclusive economic zone in the South China Sea since 2005, citing the unconstitutionality of permitting foreign corporations and governments to exploit the country's natural resources.
 January 13:
 The Sandiganbayan convicts former Maguindanao governor Sajid Ampatuan of graft and falsification of public documents, sentencing him to a maximum of 112 years in prison. Five other co-accused were convicted as well.
 Zootaxa reveals in a publication the discovery of two new species of hedgehog (Podogymnura) in the mountains of southeastern Mindanao.
 January 18 – The Court of Tax Appeals acquits online news website Rappler as well as its founder, Maria Ressa, in a tax evasion case filed against them by the country's government in 2018.
 January 24:
 The Supreme Court en banc votes, 13–1, to declare the TRAIN Law (Republic Act 10963) as constitutional, with two petitions against the law dismissed.
 A Cessna 206, bound for Maconacon, Isabela from Cauayan, is reported missing. The plane would be found on March 9 in Divilacan, with all six people aboard confirmed dead.
 January 25 – A Philippine Air Force SF.260 training flight from Sangley Point Airport in Cavite City, crashes on a paddy field in Pilar, Bataan, killing two people on board.
 January 30 – The Anti-Terrorism Council announces its resolutions, dated December 7, 2022, designating community doctor Natividad Castro, an alleged active member of the Communist Party of the Philippines–New People's Army–National Democratic Front, and the Al Khobar Group in Mindanao, allegedly linked to the Dawlah Islamiyah, as terrorists.

February 
 February 1 – Philippines–United States relations: The Philippines permits the United States Armed Forces access to an additional four military bases, thereby expediting the full implementation of the Enhanced Defense Cooperation Agreement.
 February 6 – Second Thomas Shoal laser incident: A China Coast Guard vessel allegedly uses a laser weapon on a Philippine Coast Guard ship near the Second Thomas Shoal in the South China Sea leading to the Philippines filing a diplomatic protest.
 February 8 – The Supreme Court publicizes a January 16 decision dismissing graft charges filed in 1990 against Chief Presidential Legal Counsel and former senate president Juan Ponce Enrile and eight other respondents in relation to the Coco Levy Fund scam, citing violation of the right to speedy trial as well as the deaths of four of those involved.
 February 11 – Camp Evangelista shooting: Four soldiers are killed and another is critically injured by a fellow soldier during a mass shooting at a barracks in Cagayan de Oro, Northern Mindanao. The perpetrator is shot dead.
 February 17 – Four people are killed and two others are injured, including Lanao del Sur governor Mamintal Alonto Adiong Jr., when their convoy is ambushed in Maguing, Lanao del Sur, by unknown gunmen.
 February 18 – A Cessna 340 aircraft operated by Energy Development Corporation crashes on Mayon Volcano, Albay, upon taking off from Bicol International Airport in Daraga for Manila, killing all four people on board, all of whom were employees of the corporation, including two Australian technical consultants.
 February 24 – The Philippine Independent Church ordains Wylard Ledama to the diaconate as the first trans woman clergy in the country.
 February 25 – A special election is held to fill the vacant seat in Cavite's 7th congressional district in the House of Representatives. Jesus Crispin Remulla, the previous officeholder, vacated the seat to serve as the Secretary of Justice. His son, Crispin Diego Remulla, is elected to the seat.
 February 28 – Oil tanker MT Princess Empress sinks off Naujan, Oriental Mindoro, resulting in the spillage of its diesel fuel and 800,000 liters of industrial cargo fuel. By March 20, the oil spill is affecting Oriental Mindoro, southern Occidental Mindoro, northern Palawan, Caluya in Antique, and Verde Island in Batangas City.

March 
 March 4 – Negros Oriental governor Roel Degamo and eight others are killed by unknown gunmen in Degamo's home in Pamplona, Negros Oriental.
 March 6–7 – 2023 transport strike in the Philippines: Operators of traditional public jeepneys and minivans hold a strike in various cities to protest against the Public Utility Vehicle Modernization Program. Initially planned for a week, the strike ended earlier following a meeting between labor union leaders and Office of the President officials.
 March 13:
 The Navotas Regional Trial Court (RTC), in a publicized decision, convicts dismissed policeman Jefrey Perez of murder, sentencing him to reclusión perpetua, in the second conviction in relation to the deaths of two teenagers in 2017 during the country's drug war.
 The Supreme Court, in a publicized February 8 ruling, reverses two rulings by the Court of Appeals which had ordered re-filing of charges of crimes against chastity against actor Vhong Navarro, eventually dismissing them citing lack of probable cause.
 March 15 – The Quezon City RTC convicts three of five members (two are already dead) of the Dominguez carjacking group for the 2011 murder of car dealer Venson Evangelista, sentencing them to reclusión perpetua.

Predicted and scheduled events
 October 30 – The barangay and sangguniang kabataan elections will be held. Originally scheduled for December 5, 2022, the elections had been postponed by virtue of Republic Act No. 11935, signed by President Marcos on October 10 of the same year.
 The city of San Jose del Monte, Bulacan, will gain status as a highly urbanized city, pending a plebiscite to be held four months after the national elections but long overdue, in accordance with Proclamation No. 1057.
 The municipality of Carmona, Cavite, will gain status as a component city, pending a plebiscite to be held, in accordance with Republic Act 11683.
 The country's television industry will switch off its analog broadcast and fully migrate to digital TV.

Holidays 

On August 23, 2022, through Proclamation No. 42, the national government declares holidays and special (working/non-working) days to be observed in the country. The circular was later amended through Proclamation No. 90, issued on November 11, with some holidays adjusted pursuant to the holiday economics principle. Note that in the list, holidays in bold are "regular holidays," and those in italics are "special (non-working) holidays."

 January 1 – New Year's Day
 January 2 – Additional special non-working day 
 February 24 – EDSA People Power Revolution Anniversary 
 April 6 – Maundy Thursday
 April 7 – Good Friday
 April 8 – Black Saturday
 April 10 – Araw ng Kagitingan (Day of Valor) 
 May 1 – Labor Day
 June 12 – Independence Day
 August 21 – Ninoy Aquino Day
 August 28 – National Heroes Day
 November 1 – All Saints Day
 November 2 – All Souls' Day 
 November 27 – Bonifacio Day 
 December 8 – Feast of the Immaculate Conception
 December 25 – Christmas Day
 December 30 – Rizal Day
 December 31 – Last Day of the Year 
 TBA – Eid'l Fitr (Feast of Ramadan)
 TBA – Eid'l Adha (Feast of Sacrifice)

Chinese New Year, a then special non-working day which to be celebrated on January 22, as well as Christmas Eve (December 24), declared since 2021 as a special working day, are not in the list.

In addition, several other places observe local holidays, such as the foundation of their town. These are also "special days."

Business and economy

February
 February 21 – The Senate ratifies the Regional Comprehensive Economic Partnership, finalizing the Philippines' membership in the world's largest trade bloc.

Entertainment and culture

January
 January 15 – Celeste Cortesi finishes unplaced at Miss Universe 2022 in New Orleans, Louisiana, United States. The Philippines ends its 12-year placement streak at the said pageant since 2010.
 January 29 – Maria Luisa Varela is crowned Miss Planet International in Phnom Penh, Cambodia. She becomes the Philippines' first representative to win the said pageant.

February
 February 15 – The province of Kalinga claims two Guinness World Record titles for the largest performance of the banga dance and largest gong ensemble, with more than 8,000 participants in total, both performed in Tabuk.
 February 16 – Annabelle McDonnell finishes as first runner-up at Miss Charm 2023 in Vietnam.

Predicted and scheduled events
 March 26 – Ingrid Santamaría will be competing at Reina Hispanoamericana 2022 in Bolivia.
 May – Gwendolyne Fourniol will be competing at Miss World 2023 in United Arab Emirates.

Sports

Deaths

January
 January 6:
 Benjamin Almoneda (b. 1930), Filipino Roman Catholic prelate, auxiliary bishop (1990–1991) and bishop (1991–2007) of Daet
 Mamilyn Caramat (b. 1970), mayor of Calasiao, Pangasinan
 January 12 – Manolo Lopez (b. 1942), former Filipino ambassador to Japan
 January 18 – Catalino Arevalo (b. 1925), Jesuit priest and theologian
 January 29 – Dennis Fabunan (b. 1981), Maria Cafra bassist

February
 February 1:
 Angel Alcala (b. 1929), biologist and national scientist
 Terry Saldaña (b. 1958), former basketball player
 February 4 – Roberto Ongpin (b. 1939), businessman and former Minister of Commerce and Industry
 February 5 – Khalipha Nando (b. 1940/1941), first Wa'lī of Bangsamoro and co-founder of the Moro Islamic Liberation Front
 February 6 – Maynardo Espiritu (b. 1932), former mayor of Malabon, Metro Manila (1972–1986)
 February 8 – Rainier Leopando (b. 1958), mayor of Siniloan, Laguna
 February 12:
 Lualhati Bautista (b. 1945), writer and novelist
 Angelique Alexis "Angge" Paulino (b. 1989), municipal councilor of Santo Domingo, Nueva Ecija
 February 13 – Doris Trinidad-Gamalinda (b. 1927), literary writer
 February 17 – Maurice Arcache (b. 1934), columnist
 February 19 – Rommel Alameda, vice mayor of Aparri, Cagayan
 February 28 – Rob Luna (b. 1985), Esports commentator

March
 March 1 – Emmanuel "Boybits" Victoria (b. 1971), former basketball player
 March 4 – Roel Degamo (b. 1966), governor of Negros Oriental
 March 8 – Jose David Lapuz (b. 1938), educator, cultural administrator and former Presidential Consultant for Education and International Organization
 March 11 – Angel Tic-I Hobayan (b. 1929), bishop of Diocese of Catarman
 March 14 – Luis Teodoro (b. 1941), journalist
 March 16 – Victor Ocampo (b. 1952), bishop of Diocese of Gumaca

See also

Country overviews 
 History of Philippines
 History of modern Philippines
 Outline of Philippines
 Government of Philippines
 Politics of Philippines
 Years in the Philippines
 Timeline of Philippine history

Related timelines for current period 

 2023
 2023 in politics and government
 2020s

References 

 
Philippines
Philippines
2020s in the Philippines
Years of the 21st century in the Philippines